Raj in different contexts means "rule", "king", "ruler", "emperor" or "royalty" and "power" in the Sanskrit language families of the Indian sub-continent, including Romanes, its closest Indo-European relative. The word is cognate to Latin rex.

Given name or nickname 
 Raj Ballav Koirala (born 1982), Nepalese actor
 Raj Gupta, American business executive
 Raj Kamal Jha (born 1966), Indian novelist and journalist
 Raj Kapoor (1924–1988), Indian actor, director and producer
 Raj Kaul, 18th-century ancestor of Jawahar Lal Nehru
 Raj Khosla (1925–1991), Indian director
 Raj Krishna, Indian economist
 Raj Manhas, American educator
 Raj Man Singh Chitrakar, Nepalese artist
 Raj Mohinder Singh Majitha, Indian politician
 Raj Mukherji, New Jersey lobbyist and real estate developer
 Raj Narain (1917–1986), Indian politician
 Raj Pannu (born 1934), Canadian educator and politician
 Raj Patel (born 1972), British-born academic, journalist, activist and writer
 Rajendra Persaud (born 1963), British psychiatrist, broadcaster, and author
 Raj Pradhan, Nepalese cricketer
 Dabbala Rajagopal Raj Reddy (born 1937), Indian-American pioneer in Computer Science and Artificial Intelligence
 Raj Rajaratnam (born 1957), American former manager of the hedge fund Galleon Group, convicted in 2011 of insider trading
 Raj Rajeshwari Devi (died 1806), queen consort and twice queen regent of Nepal
 Raj Singh (disambiguation), several people
 Raj Thackeray (born 1968), Indian politician

Surname 
 Anil Raj (1984–2019), American human rights activist, Amnesty International board member, killed in 2019 in Kabul while working on the United Nations Development Programme
 Besant C. Raj (1933–2018), Indian expert and writer on financial management
 Charan Raj (born 1958), Indian film actor, director, music director, film producer, and writer
 Jagdish Raj (1928–2013), Bollywood actor who holds a Guinness World Record for being the most typecast actor
 K. N. Raj (1924–2010), Indian economist
 Maria Venus Raj (born 1988), Filipino beauty queen, TV personality, model, and actress
 Mithali Raj (born 1982), Indian cricketer
 Prakash Raj or Raj (born 1965), Indian actor and producer
 Subhashni Raj (born 1986), Fijian activist

Fictional characters 
 Raj Koothrappali, on the American sitcom The Big Bang Theory
 Raj King, played by Aatif Nawaz in the British web series Corner Shop Show
 Roger "Raj" Thomas, on the American TV series What's Happening!! and What's Happening Now!!
 Raj, the neurotic Indian elephant on the American cartoon series Camp Lazlo
 Raj, the shop assistant who appears in every one of David Walliams novels except Awful Auntie

Indian masculine given names
Lists of people by nickname
Surnames of Indian origin